Fyfield is a village and civil parish in the Epping Forest district of Essex, England.

The River Roding flows south through the village. The watermill, which sits at the head of a mill pond on the River Roding, dates to the late 13th century and is a Grade II listed building.

Fyfield Hall on Willingale Road is the oldest inhabited timber-framed building in England. The house dates chiefly to the mid–13th century, contains an aisled hall dated 1140, and is Grade I listed.

Location grid

References

External links 

Fyfield, British History Online
Fyfield village web site

Epping Forest District
Civil parishes in Essex
Villages in Essex